The men's 3000 metres steeplechase event at the 1997 European Athletics U23 Championships was held in Turku, Finland, on 12 July 1997.

Medalists

Results

Final
12 July

Participation
According to an unofficial count, 11 athletes from 7 countries participated in the event.

 (2)
 (1)
 (2)
 (1)
 (2)
 (2)
 (1)

References

3000 metres steeplechase
Steeplechase at the European Athletics U23 Championships